The Hanteo Music Awards (formerly named the Hanteo Awards before 2021) is a music awards show which is held annually presented by Hanteo Global Inc.. The winners were selected based on various indices, such as Physical Album, Digital Music, Social, Media, Global Authentication, Portal, and Fandom that made a big impact on the music industry in the course of the year. 

The first ceremony was held online for awards in all categories in the aftermath of the COVID-19 pandemic to prevent further spread of the virus and to ensure the safety of both fans and artists. In 2022, Hanteo Global will be hosting its very first in-person awards show in honor of the chart's 30th anniversary.

Ceremonies

Criteria
The table below shows the score composition.

Voting for the four Daesang categories will not be separately conducted, but the voting score will be reflected based on the results of the 'Artist of the Year Awards' voting.

The table below shows the score composition.

 Final Score Composition: 65% Total Score + 35% Global Fandom Voting
 Total score consists of Physical Album, Digital Music, Media, Global Authentication, Portal, and Fandom indices.
 Special Award criteria: 100% based Global Fan Voting
 Initial Chodong Record Award criteria: 100% first-week album sales of a release.
 Sub-category: Initial Chodong Record Award Top 10, Male Group Top 3, Female Group Top 3, Male Solo Top 3, Female Solo Top 3, a Male Rookie Award, and a Female Rookie Award.

Categories
 Best Artist (Daesang) is given to the artist who demonstrated the greatest impact on the music industry.
 Best Album (Daesang) is given to the album which demonstrated the greatest impact on the music industry.
 Best Song (Daesang) is given to the song which demonstrated the greatest impact on the music industry.
 Best Performance (Daesang) is given to the artist who demonstrated the performance that had a great impact on the music industry.
 Artist of the Year (Bonsang) is the representative of the year who achieved good results in various indicators, such as physical records, digital music, social, media, global, portal, and fandom, and was also selected by global fandom.
 Global Artist Award is given to selected artists that were loved by fans from outside of Korea and all over the world for their outstanding performances overseas. Through comprehensive global indicators, awards are given for each continent, including Asia, Europe, Africa, Oceania, North America, and South America.
 Post Generation Award is given to artists who are expected to actively promote in the future from their achievements and growth in various fields this year and the leaders of K-pop's next generation.
 Emerging Artist Award is given to artists with potential considering their achievements in various fields this year. It sends support to the artists who will grow and create a bright future.
 Rookie of the Year Award is given to the new artist who debuted and is expected to actively promote in the future.
 Special Award is an award given to several artists who promote in special genres and areas with physical albums, digital music and social media.
 Trend Award is given to artists who led the trend of K-pop this year, suggested a new turning point with their music or promotion and worthy of focus in the future.
 WhosFandom Award is an award given to both the artist and their fandom based on 100% fan votes.

 Initial Chodong Record Award is given to the artists who recorded top 10 in first-week sales of a release in that year. It is awarded based on the album sales data that were automatically counted from more than 1,200 K-pop album stores in both South Korea and international.
 Artist Award is an award given to artists who have had a huge influence in the music industry during the course of the year.
 Rookie Award is given in honor for new artist (debut date until their second year of debuting) with the most achievements in the music industry during the course of the year.

Initial Chodong Record Award

Artist Award

Solo

Group

Rookie Award

WhosFandom Award

Special Award

Trot

OST

Discontinued Awards

Album Award

Singer Award (Album based)

References

South Korean music awards
2021 establishments in South Korea
Awards established in 2021
Annual events in South Korea